William Hayden Reynolds (June 29, 1847 – February 1, 1935) was the twentieth Mayor of Orlando from 1910 to 1913. He was also the owner of Orlando Telephone Company from 1908 to 1914. He died at the age of 87 in 1935.

References

Mayors of Orlando, Florida
1847 births
1935 deaths